Arkoudi (Greek: Αρκούδι, meaning bear) is a small Greek island in the Ionian Sea. It is administered by the municipality of Ithaca. , it had no resident population.

References

External links
Arkoudi on GTP Travel Pages (in English and Greek)

Islands of the Ionian Islands (region)
Islands of Greece
Landforms of Ithaca